Bronco is the debut studio album by American country music singer Canaan Smith. It was released on June 23, 2015 via Mercury Nashville. The album includes all five songs from his self-titled extended play, including the number one single "Love You Like That". The title track is a tribute to Smith's older brother, Nathaniel, who died in a car crash.

Commercial performance
The album debuted at No. 4 on the Top Country Albums chart, and at No. 29 on the US Billboard 200, selling 12,000 copies for week.
The album has sold 38,700 copies as of March 2016.

Track listing

Personnel
Brett Beavers – banjo, bass guitar, acoustic guitar, baritone guitar, electric guitar, handclapping, keyboards, mandolin, programming, sounds, stomping, synthesizer
Duffy Brown – electric guitar
Dan Couch – background vocals
Kenny Fuller – electric guitar
Mike Johnson – pedal steel guitar
Darren Rayl – drums
Jimmy Robbins – banjo, acoustic guitar, electric guitar, keyboards, mandolin, percussion, programming 
Canaan Smith – 12-string acoustic guitar, acoustic guitar, electric guitar, handclapping, keyboards, percussion, programming, sounds, synthesizer, lead vocals, background vocals
Ryan Tyndell – electric guitar, handclapping, percussion, programming, sounds, synthesizer, background vocals

Chart performance

Weekly charts

Year-end charts

Singles

References 

2015 debut albums
Canaan Smith albums
Mercury Nashville albums
Albums produced by Brett Beavers